Larry Dickson (born September 8, 1938, Marietta, Ohio), is a former driver in the USAC and CART Championship Car series.  He raced in the 1965-1981 seasons, with 105 combined career starts, including the Indianapolis 500 in 1966-1969, 1971, 1978–1979, and 1981.  He finished in the top ten 44 times, with his best finish in 2nd position in 1968 at Springfield.

Dickson was also a 3 time USAC Sprint Car Series Champion in 1968, 1970 and 1975.  Larry won 43 USAC Sprint car races and was the all-time leader in the division until Tom Bigelow broke his record.  In the years 1968-71 Larry and Gary Bettenhausen raced each other in what was billed as "The Larry and Gary Show" or "Thunder (Bettenhausen) and Lightning (Dickson)" exchanging the USAC Sprint Car title between each other during those years.

Larry also ventured to NASCAR to drive Richie Giachetti's Ford Torino in the Daytona 500, running in the top ten before the engine expired.  Larry finished his career in the USAC Silver Crown car owned by his brother, Tommy and Max Brittain.  Larry is now semi-retired, living in Indianapolis and tending to his real estate investments.

Awards
In 1990, he was inducted into the National Sprint Car Hall of Fame as part of its inaugural class.

Indy 500 results

USAC Sprint Cars = Three-time National Champion1968, 1970 and 1975. USAC records, National Speed Sport News and other national racing press.
uNITWS RACING CLUB - National Champion and Rookie of the Year 1964
Winner of the US Open supermodified race at Williams Grove, PA 1964

References

1938 births
Living people
Indianapolis 500 drivers
National Sprint Car Hall of Fame inductees
Sportspeople from Marietta, Ohio
Racing drivers from Ohio
USAC Silver Crown Series drivers